The 3 arrondissements of the Lot department are:
 Arrondissement of Cahors, (prefecture of the Lot department: Cahors) with 98 communes. The population of the arrondissement was 71,865 in 2015.  
 Arrondissement of Figeac, (subprefecture: Figeac) with 118 communes.  The population of the arrondissement was 54,468 in 2015.  
 Arrondissement of Gourdon, (subprefecture: Gourdon) with 97 communes. The population of the arrondissement was 47,067 in 2015.

History

In 1800 the arrondissements of Cahors, Figeac, Gourdon and Montauban were established. The arrondissement of Montauban was ceded to the new department Tarn-et-Garonne in 1808. All of the remaining arrondissements have never disbanded.

The borders of the arrondissements of Lot were modified in January 2017:
 two communes from the arrondissement of Cahors to the arrondissement of Figeac
 18 communes from the arrondissement of Cahors to the arrondissement of Gourdon

References

Lot